Jonathan Walker (1799 – May 1, 1878), known as "The Man with the Branded Hand", was an American reformer who became a national hero in 1844 when he was tried and sentenced as a slave stealer following his attempt to help seven runaway slaves find freedom.  He was branded on his hand by the United States Government with the markings "S S", for "Slave Stealer".

Biography

Jonathan Walker was born in Harwich, Massachusetts. During his youth in Massachusetts, Walker learned to sail and became captain of a fishing vessel. In early 1837, he went to Florida and became a railroad contractor. The condition of the slaves interested him, and in 1844 Walker aided several of them as they attempted to make escape in an open boat from the coast of Florida to the British West Indies, where slavery had been abolished ten years before. After doubling the capes, Captain Walker fell seriously ill; the crew, being ignorant of navigation, would all have been drowned if a wrecking sloop had not rescued them and taken Walker to Key West.  From there, he was sent in chains aboard  to Pensacola, where he was put in prison, chained to the floor, and deprived of light and proper food. Walker later wrote about the degrading conditions inside the jailhouse and the brutality shown toward slaves there.

Put on trial in federal court in Pensacola, Walker was convicted, heavily fined and sentenced to be tied to a pillory, and publicly branded on his right hand with the letters "S S" (for "slave stealer".  But to sympathizers it meant "Slave Savior".) United States Marshal Eben Dorr, who also traded slaves, executed the branding with a hot iron. Walker was then returned to jail, confined eleven months, and released only after northern abolitionists paid his fine. For five years after his release, Walker lectured on slavery in the northern and western states. For instance, in 1847/48 he was on a four-and-a-half-month lecture tour together with John S. Jacobs. 

Walker—along with Stephen Symonds Foster and Abby Kelley Foster, Sojourner Truth, Marius Robinson, and Sallie Holley—reorganized the Michigan Anti-Slavery Society in 1853 in Adrian, Michigan. The state society was founded in 1836 in Ann Arbor, Michigan.

He lived in Wisconsin in 1855  and 1860  near Winooski, Wisconsin. He moved to Michigan around 1866 and lived near Muskegon.

Jonathan Walker died on May 1, 1878, in Lake Harbor near Norton Shores, Michigan. He is buried at Evergreen Cemetery in Muskegon. His wife Jane Gage Walker 1803-1871 is buried at Norton Cemetery, Norton Shores MI. Their two youngest sons (born in 1843 and 1848) predeceased their parents, but two sons and five daughters survived both parents. A monument was erected to Captain Walker's memory on August 1, 1878.  The monument was funded by abolitionist Photius Fisk.  He funded several monuments for abolitionists.

The monument became a national shrine for those working towards racial justice.

Walker was the subject of John Greenleaf Whittier's poem "The Branded Hand". Whittier learned about Walker by reading a book about him called Trial and Imprisonment of Jonathan Walker. The poem praised Walker's actions.

A plaque commemorating Walker was erected on the lawn next to the Harwich, Massachusetts Historical Society.  Another Rev. John Walker (1786–1845) was a Presbyterian minister and abolitionist in Pennsylvania and Ohio who founded Franklin College in Ohio.

See also
John Murrell (bandit)
Reverse Underground Railroad
Underground Railroad

References

Further reading
Jonathan Walker: The Man with the Branded Hand by Alvin F. Oickle. Westholme Publishing, 2011. 
Branded Hand by Elmer Koppelmann
Wilson, Henry, The History of the Rise and Fall of the Slave Power in America. Boston, 1874.
"Trial and Imprisonment" by Jonathan Walker
 Jonathan Berger, "White Suffering and the Branded Hand", Mirror of Race.
 Kittredge, Frank Edward. 1899. The Man with the Branded Hand: An Authentic Sketch of the Life and Services of Capt. Jonathan Walker. HL Wilson Printing Company.

External links

Massachusetts Historical Society
Walker's personal account of his ordeal. 
Portrait & Signature
Woodcut of Walker's branded hand
Portrait of Captain Walker {reference only}
Wisconsin Historical Society Essay-The Man with the Branded Hand
 

1799 births
1878 deaths
1844 crimes in the United States
American abolitionists
People from Harwich, Massachusetts
People from Muskegon County, Michigan
People from Sheboygan County, Wisconsin
Businesspeople from Florida
19th-century American criminals
19th-century American businesspeople
Businesspeople from Massachusetts
Activists from Massachusetts
Activists from Florida
Activists from Michigan